Vasum subpugillare is an extinct species of medium to large sea snail, a marine gastropod mollusk in the family Turbinellidae.

Description

Distribution
Fossils of this marine species have been found in Oligocene strata in France.

References

 Lozouet, P. (2021). Turbinelloidea, Mitroidea, Olivoidea, Babyloniidae et Harpidae (Gastropoda, Neogastropoda) de l'Oligocène supérieur (Chattien) du bassin de l'Adour (Sud-Ouest de la France). Cossmanniana. 23: 3-69.

External links
 Orbigny A. D. d'. (1850-1852). Prodrome de paléontologie stratigraphique universelle des animaux mollusques et rayonnés, faisant suite au cours élémentaire de paléontologie et de géologie stratigraphiques. Paris: Masson. vol. 1 
 Actes de la Société linnéenne de Bordeaux; tome XCI 1939-1940
  Harzhauser, Mathias & Fehse, Dirk. (2007). Oligocene and Aquitanian Gastropod Faunas from the Sultanate of Oman and their biogeographic implications for the early western Indo-Pacific. Palaeontographica, Abteilung A: Palaozoologie - Stratigraphie. 280. 75-121. 10.1127/pala/280/2007/75. 

subpugillare
Gastropods described in 1852